The Estonian Society of Human Genetics (ESTSHG) (Estonian: Eesti Inimesegeneetika Ühing) is a non-profit organization that promotes research and communication between scientists involved in human and medical genetics.

Functions

The Estonian Society of Human Genetics was founded in 1999. 
It organizes educational events related to biotechnology, and specifically the study of genetics in Estonia.
As of 2012, the society had about 87 members.
The Estonian Society of Human Genetics is associated with the Estonian Academy of Sciences. 
It is also associated with the European Society of Human Genetics (ESHG).

Board
As of 2012, the President was Andres Metspalu.
Metspalu is a past President of the European Society of Human Genetics.
The Board as of 2012 was:
Professor Andres Metspalu, President, Institute of Molecular and Cell Biology, University Genome Center, Estonian Biocentre
Professor Aavo-Valdur Mikelsaar TÜ, Faculty of Medicine
Professor  Ants Kurg, TÜ Institute of Molecular and Cell Biology
Doctor Riin Tamm, TÜ Institute of Molecular and Cell Biology, TÜ Genome
Doctor Tiia Reimand, SA TÜ Clinics, United Laboratory of Genetics
Professor Andres Veske, TTÜ Institute of Genetic Engineering

References
Citations

Sources

 

Genetics organizations
Medical and health organizations based in Estonia
Science and technology in Estonia
1999 establishments in Estonia